Carbon County may refer to:
 Carbon County, Montana 
 Carbon County, Pennsylvania 
 Carbon County, Utah 
 Carbon County, Wyoming